Platanthera shriveri, Shriver's purple fringed orchid, is a rare orchid endemic to the United States. It is considered critically imperiled.

Description

Platanthera shriveri plants look very similar to Platanthera grandiflora and a hybrid origin with Platanthera lacera is suspected. To distinguish Platanthera shriveri from Platanthera grandiflora small morphological details and a different bloom time (July and August, about 3 weeks later) have to be observed.

Distribution and habitat

The only known populations are in Maryland, North Carolina, Pennsylvania (historic record only), Virginia and West Virginia. They grow in woodlands and along stream banks.

Taxonomy
Platanthera shriveri was described as a new species by P. M. Brown in 2008.

There is ongoing research whether the plants described as Platanthera shriveri are a separate botanical species or can be considered within the morphological and bloom time ranges of Platanthera grandiflora.

References

shriveri
Orchids of the United States